Higher Truth is the fourth studio album by American rock musician Chris Cornell, and the final album to be released during his lifetime and his final album of original material. It was released on September 18, 2015.

Recording
Cornell chose producer Brendan O'Brien as a collaborator to create a more intimate sound for the record. On recording drums for the album, Cornell has stated that "most of the songs with drums are either loops that I made electronically or that Brendan basically recorded just playing a little drum kit he had," Cornell says. "We just made loops, layered things and played some percussion stuff."

Critical reception

Upon its release, Higher Truth received generally favorable reviews from music critics. At Metacritic, which assigns a normalized rating out of 100 to reviews from mainstream critics, the album received an average score of 68 based on 11 reviews, which indicates "generally favorable reviews". Stephen Thomas Erlewine of AllMusic said, "While Higher Truth never seems as self-consciously confessional as Euphoria Mourning, this mellow simplicity is an attribute: a relaxed Cornell creates a comforting mood piece that's enveloping in its warmth." Collin Brennan of Consequence of Sound stated, "Higher Truth ironically doesn't strive for anything higher. It stakes its claim in the rich soils of the middle ground, a place that values intimacy above innovation, quiet truths above the ones that scream. And it's all the better for it."

Track listing

Personnel
Credits adapted from AllMusic.

Musicians
 Chris Cornell – vocals, guitar, bass, mandolin, percussion
 Brendan O'Brien – guitar, bass, keyboards, hurdy-gurdy, drums, percussion, production, mixing
 Patrick Warren – piano
 Matt Chamberlain – drums
 Anne Marie Simpson – strings

Production
 Billy Joe Bowers – engineering, mastering
 Kyle Stevens – engineering
 Tom Syrowski – engineering

Additional personnel
 Monique McGuffin – production management
 Jeff Fura – A&R
 Josh Graham – art direction
 Suspended in Light – art direction
 Liuba Shapiro – product management
 Jeff Lipsky – photography

Charts

References

2015 albums
Chris Cornell albums
Albums produced by Brendan O'Brien (record producer)